Rubina Irfan (born 5 August 1965) is a Pakistani politician who is a member of the Pakistan Muslim League (Q) and head of the party's women's wing. Since March 2012, she has served as a Senator of Pakistan. In 2002 she was elected to the Provincial Assembly of Balochistan. from 2007-2012 she served as a Law Minister in Balochistan. She is married to Agha Irfan Karim, a former member of the Balochistan Assembly. She is the mother of football players Raheela Zarmeen and Shahlyla Baloch, the later of whom died in a car accident in 2016.

Football 

In 2004 Irfan founded Balochistan United W.F.C. around her three daughters and entered the team into the Pakistani women's football championship. She has also been the president of the Pakistan Football Federation's women's department since its inception in 2005. She supported the launch and development of the Pakistan women's national football team.

References

External links 
 Profile at Provincial Assembly of Balochistan

Living people
Politicians from Quetta
Pakistan Muslim League (Q) politicians
1965 births
Association football executives
21st-century Pakistani women politicians
Pakistani senators (14th Parliament)
Pakistani MNAs 2018–2023
Balochistan Awami Party MNAs
Magsi family